CIBER is an acronym that may refer to

 Centre for Integrative Bee Research, an institution in Australia that makes basic scientific research concerning honeybee reproduction, immunity, and ecology.
 Cosmic Infrared Background ExpeRiment, an optical astrophysics payload for the California Institute of Technology

See also
 Ciber, an information technology company
 Cyber (disambiguation)